HMIS Orissa (J200) was a s built for the Royal Navy, but transferred to the Royal Indian Navy (RIN) during the Second World War.

Design and description
The Bangor class was designed as a small minesweeper that could be easily built in large numbers by civilian shipyards; as steam turbines were difficult to manufacture, the ships were designed to accept a wide variety of engines. The ship's complement consisted of 60 officers and ratings.

She was powered by two vertical triple-expansion steam engines (VTE), each driving one shaft, using steam provided by two Admiralty three-drum boilers.

The VTE-powered Bangors were armed with a  anti-aircraft gun and a single QF 2-pounder (4 cm) AA gun or a quadruple mount for the Vickers .50 machine gun. In some ships the 2-pounder was replaced a single or twin 20 mm Oerlikon AA gun, while most ships were fitted with four additional single Oerlikon mounts over the course of the war. For escort work, their minesweeping gear could be exchanged for around 40 depth charges.

Construction and career
HMIS Orissa was ordered from Lobnitz & Co. originally for the Royal Navy as HMS Clydebank in 1940. However, before she was launched, she was transferred to the Royal Indian Navy and eventually commissioned as Orissa. The ship was a part of the Eastern Fleet, and escorted numerous convoys between Africa, British India and Australia in 1943-45.

On 22 February 1944, Orissa with HMAS Tamworth rescued the surviving crew of the American tanker E.G. Seubert which was torpedoed and sunk by  about 200 nautical miles east of Aden in position .

References

Bibliography
 

Bangor-class minesweepers of the Royal Indian Navy
1941 ships
Ships built on the River Clyde
World War II minesweepers of India